Eristena brevisigna is a moth in the family Crambidae. It was described by Fu-Qiang Chen, Shi-Mei Song and Chun-Sheng Wu in 2006. It is found in Fujian, China.

References

Acentropinae
Moths described in 2006